The 1985 Pontins Professional was the twelfth edition of the professional invitational snooker tournament which took place between 11 and 18 May 1985 in Prestatyn, Wales.

The tournament featured eight professional players. The quarter-final matches were contested over the best of 9 frames, the semi-final matches over the best of 11 frames, and the final over the best of 17 frames.

Terry Griffiths won the event for the second time, beating John Spencer 9–7 in the final.

Main draw

References

Pontins Professional
Snooker competitions in Wales
Pontins Professional
Pontins Professional
Pontins Professional